François-Louis David Bocion (30 March 1828, Lausanne - 12 December 1890, Lausanne) was a Swiss painter, designer and art professor, known primarily for his landscapes of the area around Lake Geneva.

Biography 
He was the youngest of five children born to the carpenter, Henri-Louis Bocion (1792-1835), who was originally from Bournens, and his wife Suzanne-Catherine. After his father's death, the family's financial situation became untenable and he was placed with his paternal grandfather, a marble sculptor, in Montreux. His grandfather, in turn, died in 1840 and François went to live with his mother's family in Vevey, where he completed his primary education.

During those years, he was introduced to drawing by Christian-Gottlieb Steinlen (1779-1847) and François Bonnet (1811-1894). This inspired him to visit Paris in 1846, where he frequented the studios of Louis-Aimé Grosclaude and Charles Gleyre at the École des Beaux-arts. He also made friends with Gustave Courbet. After a bout with typhoid fever, he returned to Lausanne.

He held his first showing with the "Société des beaux-arts" (Turnus), shortly thereafter. From 1849 until his death, he was a Professor of Drawing at the École industrielle de Lausanne and designed the school's student uniform. He was a regular contributor of cartoons to the satirical journal, La Guêpe (The Wasp) from 1851 to 1854. Until 1858, he made numerous trips to Italy. His painting of Venice was purchased by the Canton of Vaud and hangs in the meeting room of the Council of State. He also took private students, notably Théophile Steinlen and Eugène Grasset.

In 1859, he married Anna-Barbara Furrer. They had nine children, five of whom died in infancy.

A pedestrian passage in Lausanne was named after him in 1924.

Further reading 
 Béatrice Aubert-Lecoultre: François Bocion, Ed. Marendaz, Lutry, (1977)
 Michel Reymondin: Catalogue raisonné de François Bocion, Wormer, (1989) 
 Dominique Radrizzani, François Bocion : au seuil de l'impressionnisme, 5 continents, Milan (2006)

External links

 
 
 More works by Bocion @ ArtNet
 Exhibition "Au seuil de l'impressionnisme" (2006/07)  Musée Jenisch, Vevey

1828 births
1890 deaths
People from Lausanne
19th-century Swiss painters
Swiss male painters
19th-century Swiss male artists